CAPRiM Ltd (Corporate Asset Protection and Risk Management), was an intelligence service used by corporations.

Background 
CAPRiM was established in May 1993 as a successor to the Economic League, which had held the construction industry's blacklist until it was wound up in 1993 after a parliamentary inquiry and bad press. It provided continued employment for two former League directors, Jack Winder and Stan Hardy. The construction company Sir Robert McAlpine Ltd invested £10,000 in founding CAPRiM on the understanding that it would not interfere with The Consulting Association.

Targets 
In evidence given to the Scottish Parliamentary Affairs Committee, as part of its inquiry into blacklisting on 5 February 2013, the former CAPRiM director Jack Winder said that it held information and knowledge on campaigning groups and "far-left" political parties seen as a threat to businesses such as the following:
 Greenpeace
 Reclaim the Streets
 Ethical consumerism
 Campaign Against the Arms Trade
 Animal rights
 Anti-GM activists

CAPRiM warned firms of those that it believed could "weaken a company's ability to manage its affairs profitably". Its monitor said: "Companies need to be warned what these organisations are saying and planning. Caprim provides this information. And assesses the strength of the threat. And advises on appropriate action".

Directors 
Jack Winder claimed that the joint managing directors were himself and Stan Hardy, and its non-executive directors were Sir Henry Saxon Tate CBE (of Tate & Lyle) and Bernard Norman Sefton-Forbes. Hardy had previously been the director-general of the Economic League and was a director of CAPRiM until at least 1999.

References

Construction and civil engineering companies of the United Kingdom
Consulting firms established in 1993
Informal legal terminology
Labour relations in the United Kingdom
Defunct companies of Scotland
1993 establishments in Scotland
2009 disestablishments in Scotland
British companies established in 1993
Construction and civil engineering companies established in 1993
Construction and civil engineering companies disestablished in 2009